The chess events at the 2007 All-Africa Games were held from 12 to 21 July at the Cité des Sciences in Algiers. Teams played matches on four : each team consisted of a minimum of four players and up to two optional reserve players. In the team competitions, medals were awarded to the teams scoring the highest number of board points, as well as to individual players with the best performances on each board in terms of win percentage.

Thirteen men's teams played a round-robin tournament held from 12 to 19 July. Egypt went undefeated through the tournament, conceding only one draw to Zambia, to win the team gold medal for the second time in a row, scoring 40 board points. South Africa scored 34½ board points, including 11 out of 12 in the final three rounds, to win the team silver medal. Zambia finished half a point behind and took bronze. Egypt's win qualified them to participate in the seventh World Team Chess Championship held in Bursa in 2010.

Six women's teams played a double round-robin held from 12 to 19 July. Although the tournament was much more competitive than the first edition held in Abuja in 2003, Algeria, South Africa and Nigeria replicated their podium finishes. South Africa led at the halfway point but lost 3–1 in the sixth round to host nation Algeria, who won the team gold medal with 28½ board points. South Africa recovered to beat Nigeria in the final round 2.5-1.5 to win the team silver medal with 26 board points. Nigeria finished half a point behind and settled for bronze.

The men's and women's individual blitz competitions took place on 20 and 21 July. Each country was allowed to enter a maximum of three players into each blitz tournament. Egypt's Ahmed Adly and Mona Khaled won the men's and women's tournaments respectively.

Participating nations

Medal summary

Medal table

References

2007 All-Africa Games
2007
All-Africa Games
2007 All-Africa Games